The Illawarra Baseball League is a sports league of Wollongong, Kiama and the Shoalhaven.  It conducts the sport of baseball as the region's organising body.  It has eight active clubs.  The I.B.A. is a member of the NSW Country Baseball Association, which falls under the banner of the New South Wales Baseball.

Clubs

See also

Australian Baseball Federation
New South Wales Major League
New South Wales Patriots

References

External links 
Illawarra Senior Baseball League
Baseball NSW 

Baseball leagues in Australia
Sport in Wollongong
Baseball in New South Wales